Ebba Nørager (4 December 1927 – 10 February 2021) was a Danish actress.

Biography
Nørager graduated from the Alliancescenernes Elevskole in 1947 and immediately began acting at the Odense Teater until 1949. For a number of years, she was a director at the  Statens Bibliotek og Trykkeri for Blinde, where she read many audiobooks. She once appeared on the television series  in 1979. Nørager remained active until her death.

Ebba Nørager died on 10 February 2021 at the age of 93.

References

1927 births
2021 deaths
Danish actresses
People from Copenhagen
Place of death missing